Lionel Soccoïa is a French professional football coach. After a recent stint in South Africa, he is the coach of Kano Pillars in Nigeria.

Professional coach career
Soccoïa had a long career as a professional club coach and sport director.

 2004-2009: Rapid Omnisports de Menton, Menton (France)
Head coach of the professional team

 2009-2011: Centre International de Formation Adjavon Sébastien, Djeffa (Benin)
Head coach of the professional team and technical director

 2012-2013: Académie de Foot Amadou Diallo de Djékanou, Abidjan (Ivory Coast)
Head coach of the professional team

 2013-2015: Centre de Formation de Mounana, Mounana (Gabon)
Head coach of the professional team

 2015-2016: Coton Sport Football Club de Garoua, Garoua (Cameroon)
General Manager of the Professional Team

 2017: Dubai Cultural Sports Club, Dubai (United Arab Emirates)
Head coach of the professional team

 2018: African Lyon Football Club, Dar es Salaam (Tanzania)
Head coach of the professional team

 2019: Black Leopards Football Club, Thohoyandou (South Africa)
Head coach of the professional team

 2020-2021 : Kano Pillars Football Club (Nigeria)
Head coach of the professional team

Honors
 French championship 6th Tier Champion 2003-2004
 Benin Second Division championship Champion 2009-2010 
 Benin Premier League championship Vice Champion 2010-2011 
 Winner of Gabonese Supercup 2013-2014
 Gabonese Premier League championship Vice Champion 2013-2014 
 Winner of Gabonese cup 2014-2015
 UAE Second Division championship Champion 2017

Qualifications
 UEFA B Coaching Diploma
 UEFA A Coaching Diploma
 CAF Coaching license workshop for clubs coaches Coupe confédération  and Champions league

References

Living people
French football managers
Year of birth missing (living people)